"I'll Always Call Your Name" is a song by Australian band Little River Band. Originally released as a promotional single, the song was released in January 1977 in North American and limited European countries as the final single from the group's self-titled studio album. The song peaked at number 62 on the US Billboard Hot 100 in February 1977.

Reception
Cash Box magazine said "Even without considering that they are a new group from Australia, the Little River Band logged a fine initial track record with their first single, and this selection from the debut album continues the pop harmonies and creative instrumentals that attracted fans at the beginning. For AM and FM play".

Track listings
North American 7" (4380) 
Side A. "I'll Always Call Your Name" - 3:35
Side B. "The Man in Black" - 5:06

German 7" (1C 006-82 345) 
Side A. "I'll Always Call Your Name" - 3:35
Side B. "The Man in Black" - 5:06

Charts

References 

1977 singles
Little River Band songs
1975 songs
EMI Records singles
Harvest Records singles